Leptodactylus jolyi is a species of frog in the family Leptodactylidae.
It is endemic to Brazil.
Its natural habitats are subtropical or tropical moist shrubland, subtropical or tropical high-altitude grassland, intermittent freshwater marshes, and pastureland.
It is threatened by habitat loss.

References

jolyi
Endemic fauna of Brazil
Amphibians described in 1978
Taxonomy articles created by Polbot